Myelois circumvoluta, the thistle ermine, is a small moth species of the family Pyralidae. It is found in Europe.

This pyralid has a pattern of black dots on its whitish forewings, resembling many ermine moths (family Yponomeutidae). Among the Lepidoptera, the pyralids and the ermine moths are not closely related, however: the latter are basal Ditrysia, while the former belong to the much more advanced Obtectomera.

The moth flies in one generation in late spring to early summer, e.g. from the end of May to June in Belgium and the Netherlands.

The caterpillars feed on Cynareae thistles – greater burdock (Arctium lappa), cotton thistle (Onopordum acanthium), and Carduus and Cirsium species.

External links
 
 waarneming.nl 
 Lepidoptera of Belgium
 Thistle ermine on UKMoths

Phycitini
Moths described in 1785
Moths of Japan
Moths of Europe
Moths of Asia